Arthur Schmidt may refer to:

Arthur Schmidt (film editor) (born 1937), American film editor
Arthur Schmidt (general) (1895–1987), German World War II general
Arthur P. Schmidt (1912–1965), American film editor
Arthur P. Schmidt (music publisher) (1846–1921), American music publisher

See also
Arthur Schmitt (1910–1989), German gymnast
Arthur J. Schmitt (1893–1971), American engineer, inventor, entrepreneur and philanthropist